The Cypselosomatidae are a family of true flies (Diptera) closely related to the Micropezidae. Some species are believed to be associated with bat guano.

Distribution
They occur worldwide, including Australia.

References

Brachycera families
Nerioidea